Gıyasettin Yılmaz (born 6 May 1938) is a Turkish former wrestler who competed in the 1964 Summer Olympics, in the 1968 Summer Olympics, and in the 1972 Summer Olympics.

References

External links
 

1938 births
Living people
Olympic wrestlers of Turkey
Wrestlers at the 1964 Summer Olympics
Wrestlers at the 1968 Summer Olympics
Wrestlers at the 1972 Summer Olympics
Turkish male sport wrestlers
20th-century Turkish people
21st-century Turkish people
World Wrestling Championships medalists